Peter Prendergast (1924 - 14 July 1991) was an Irish hurler who played as a centre-back for the Kilkenny senior team.

Born in Thomastown, County Kilkenny, Prendergast first arrived on the inter-county scene when he first linked up with the Kilkenny senior team, making his debut in the 1947 championship. Prendergast was a regular member of the team over the next few years. During that time he won one All-Ireland medal and two Leinster medals. He was an All-Ireland runner-up on one occasion.

Prendergast also represented the Leinster inter-provincial team, however, he never won a Railway Cup medal. At club level he won one championship medal with Thomastown.

Honours

Team

Thomastown
Kilkenny Senior Hurling Championship (1): 1946

Kilkenny
All-Ireland Senior Hurling Championship (1): 1947
Leinster Senior Hurling Championship (2): 1947 1950

References

1924 births
1991 deaths
Thomastown hurlers
Kilkenny inter-county hurlers
Leinster inter-provincial hurlers
All-Ireland Senior Hurling Championship winners